Social integration is the process during which newcomers or minorities are incorporated into the social structure of the host society.

Social integration, together with economic integration and identity integration, are three main dimensions of a newcomers' experiences in the society that is receiving them. A higher extent of social integration contributes to a closer social distance between groups and more consistent values and practices. Bringing together various ethnic groups irrespective of language, caste, creed, etc., without losing one's identity. It gives access to all areas of community life and eliminates segregation.

In a broader view, social integration is a dynamic and structured process in which all members participate in dialogue to achieve and maintain peaceful social relations. Social integration does not mean forced assimilation. Social integration is focused on the need to move toward a safe, stable and just society by mending conditions of social conflict, social disintegration, social exclusion, social fragmentation, exclusion and polarization, and by expanding and strengthening conditions of social integration towards peaceful social relations of coexistence, collaboration and cohesion.

Definition of integration 
Integration was first studied by Valle and Burgess in 1921 through the concept of assimilation. They defined it as "a process of interpenetration and fusion in which persons and groups acquire the memories, sentiments, and attitude of other persons and groups and, by sharing their experience and history, are incorporated with them in a common cultural life."

While some scholars offered an assimilation theory, arguing that immigrants would be assimilated into the host society economically, socially and culturally over successive generations, others developed a multiculturalism theory, anticipating that immigrants could maintain their ethnic identities through the integration process to shape the host society with a diversified cultural heritage.

Extending from the assimilation theory, a third group of scholars proposed a segmented integration theory, stressing that different groups of migrants might follow distinct trajectories towards upward or downward mobility on different dimensions, depending on their individual, contextual and structural factors.

Measurements 
Compared with other dimensions of integration, social integration focuses more on the degree to which immigrants adapt local customs, social relations, and daily practices. It is usually measured through social network, language, and intermarriage. The most commonly used indicator of social integration is social network, which refers to the connection that immigrants build with others in the host society. While some researchers use the total number of immigrants' friends as a measure, others use the frequency of interaction with friends. One thing worthy noting is that more and more studies differentiate local friends from immigrant friends because the former is considered more important in integrating immigrants into the local society than the latter. Recent studies, published in 2020, use access to social activities (e.g., being able to join a local sports team) as a measurement for social integration. Comparable results are available for 23 European countries.

Language is another important variable to access the degree of immigrants' social integration. A higher level in grasping local language results in more chances to communicate with local people and a better understanding of local culture. A typical question used in survey is as "Do you understand the local people's language?" In the United States, for instance, the fluency of English is a widely used indicator and can be easily found in a report on immigration.

Intermarriage is also an indicator of social integration. For those who are unmarried, they will be asked: "Would you consider marrying a local people?"; for those married, question will be like "Would you like your children to consider marrying a local people?" Answers to these questions are a good predictor of immigrants' willingness to be integrated into the host society.

Examples and uses 
In many instances education is used as a mechanism for social promotion. Neither education nor work can be ensured without a form of law. In relation to tolerant and open societies, members of minority groups often use social integration to gain full access to the opportunities, rights and services available to the members of the mainstream of society with cultural institutions such as churches and civic organizations. Mass media content also performs a social integration function in mass societies.

The 2005 documentary "Utan gränser – en film om idrott och integration" (Without Borders – A Film About Sports and Integration) was a film described by Swedish newspaper Aftonbladet as "a documentary on how to succeed with integration" of migrants into Swedish society.

The term "social integration" first came into use in the work of French sociologist Émile Durkheim. He wanted to understand why rates of suicide were higher in some social classes than others. Durkheim believed that society exerted a powerful force on individuals. He concluded that a people's beliefs, values, and norms make up a collective consciousness, a shared way of understanding each other and the world.

A 2012 research review found that working-class students were less socially integrated than middle-class students at university.

Recent research also shows that immigrants should be independent and proactive in order to achieve better social integration in their host countries. For further information, see here.

From a demographic and cultural standpoint, recent longitudinal studies suggest that social isolation or integration has shown to increase in older Spanish individuals, especially those whom may be suffering from neurocognitive disorders such as dementia and overall cognitive decline.

The United Nations has a Social Integration Branch, which is a part of the Division for Social Policy and Development (Department of Economic and Social Affairs). It also issues a quarterly publication named Bulletin on Social Integration Policies. The UN Alliance of Civilizations initiative works on Migration and Integration as a key for intercultural understanding. An Online Community on Migration and Integration shows Good Practices from around the world.

Mutual Understanding 
In migration and integration education and in social institutions such as community organizations, in schools, engaged volunteers, social workers, social pedagogues and helpers, one encounters different perspectives and migration backgrounds again and again. Not only people who help asylum seekers work together with people from a different cultural context, this work is also significant for social educators, social workers, teachers, counselors, family helpers, committed volunteers, caregivers, authorities and the police - as it is in general in social coexistence. Communication problems caused by the different cultures arise from the perspective of non-migrants when working in the above-mentioned areas with refugees, migrants and asylum seekers from different cultures. Misunderstandings can be caused; or actions, expressions, attitudes or statements of values or behaviors can be unintentionally misunderstood or misinterpreted. These obstacles in the way of understanding with people from a different cultural background have major potential to have negative effects that need to be overcome. Therefore, it is also the responsibility of migration and integration counselors to practice a form of intercultural communication that is acceptable to all parties involved. In a society where many people with a migration background live, mutual understanding is crucial to promote a future of appreciation, robustness and diversity from all sides. Intercultural understanding and communication is a real social challenge for social services - and for society as a whole.

See also

Acculturation
Cultural assimilation
Cultural diversity
Jim Crow laws
Social cohesion
Social exclusion
Suffrage
TPI-theory

References

Cultural assimilation
Structural functionalism